Stephen William Negus (born February 19, 1952) is a Canadian drummer, songwriter, who was a member of the progressive rock band Saga for twenty-six years.  In the late 80s, he and keyboardist Jim Gilmour left Saga and formed  GNP (Gilmour Negus Project).

Biography
While playing at Larry's Hideaway, a club in Toronto, Steve Negus' drumming came to the attention of the Canadian rock band, Fludd. The band was searching for a new drummer, and offered Steve the job that night. Several weeks later Steve joined Fludd as their new drummer.

While in Fludd, Steve Negus met bassist Jim Crichton and keyboardist Peter Rochon, who would later join him as founding members of Pockets, the original working name of Saga. Brian and Ed Pilling were the creative force behind Fludd, and about a year after Steve joined, Brian was stricken with leukemia and the band couldn't continue to perform.

A new band, Pockets, was formed out of Fludd's rhythm section.  Negus, Crichton, and Rochon went into eight months of rehearsal to form the new band with Jim Crichton's younger brother Ian Crichton on guitar and Michael Sadler as the singer. They changed their name to Saga a year later.

With Saga, Negus earned many gold and platinum selling CDs in Europe, Canada, and the U.S.  In 1981, the band went to England to work with Rupert Hine as producer, and Worlds Apart was recorded at Farmyard Studios.  Producer Hine also had Steve play drums on Chris de Burgh's album, The Getaway.  “Don't Pay the Ferryman” was the single from that album, which went to #34 on the Billboard Hot 100 chart in the United States.  The Getaway went to number one on the German charts, followed by Saga's own Worlds Apart at number two.

In the late 80's, Negus and keyboardist Jim Gilmour left Saga and formed GNP (Gilmour Negus Project) with singer Robert Bevan for Virgin Records. The CD Safety Zone which was produced by Negus came out in 1989. Before a follow-up CD could be written and recorded, Negus and Gilmour reunited with Saga which ended GNP.  In 2003, Negus left Saga once again.

In 2007, Negus released his first true solo project "Dare to Dream" through Cyclone Records. Steve Negus also co-produced and engineered songs for Jaclyn Kenyon on her original songs "Whatcha Gonna Do" and "See it Through me" in 2009.

Discography

Other album appearances
 Chris de Burgh - The Getaway (1982)
 Rupert Hine - Waving Not Drowning (1982)
 GNP - Safety Zone (1989)
 Top Dead Centre - Take another Breath (album) Tracks "Charlene" & "I Can't Touch You" (2012)

Solo
 Negus - Dare to Dream (2007)

See also
 Canadian rock
 List of bands from Canada
 Music of Canada

References
Citations

External links
 Steve Negus at Cyclone Records
 Steve Negus at MySpace
 Saga Fan Page
 
  Entry for GNP
 Entry at canadianbands.com for GNP

1952 births
Living people
People from Grimsby
Canadian rock drummers
Canadian male drummers
Musicians from Hamilton, Ontario